The Kassel Mission on 27 September 1944 was also known as the air battle over the Seulingswald. The mission aimed to destroy the factories in Kassel of the engineering works of Henschel & Sohn which built tracked armoured vehicles (the "Tiger" and "Panther" tanks) and their associated infrastructure. See bombing of Kassel in World War II.

Main battle 
For this mission the 8th Air Force dispatched 283 B-24 Liberator bombers of the 2nd Combat Bombardment Wing and, as escorts, 198 P-51 Mustang fighters.

As the result of a navigation error, the lead ship of the 445th Bombardment Group turned almost due east instead of east-southeast and its 35 bombers bypassed Kassel, deciding instead to bomb the railway facilities in the town of Göttingen. The marshalling yard and the repair shop were, however, missed. Instead, 25 buildings in the village of Rosdorf, on the SW edge of Göttingen, were damaged and three people injured. The villagers there counted a total of 103 bomb craters. As a result of the change of course, the bombers lost their fighter escort on the return flight. Around 11:00 am they turned west over the Seulingswald forest between Bad Hersfeld and Eisenach and were almost immediately attacked by 150 fighters of the German Jagdgeschwader squadrons, numbers 3 (Udet), 4 and 300. These fighter wings had Bf 109s and Fw 190 which had been specially adapted and equipped with extra armour and 20 and 30 mm cannon for attacking bomber formations. The air battle only lasted for a few minutes "but it was a horrendous attack" and 25 bombers were shot down across an area 15 miles (24 km) across and went down over the Seulingswald. Total losses were avoided by the late arrival of the 361st Fighter Group. In addition, six additional bombers crashed on the return flight to their home base at Tibenham in Norfolk, England; only four bombers made it home unscathed.

American losses were 31 B-24 Liberator bombers and one P-51 Mustang. 118 Americans were killed, of whom 11 were murdered after parachuting to safety. 121 Americans ended up in German POW camps and survived.

German losses came to 29 fighters and 18 pilots killed. In addition, seven people died when a German aeroplane crashed on a German medical base

This air battle was one of the largest confrontations between the United States Army Air Forces (USAAF) and the Luftwaffe which was barely still active at this time.

Follow-up operations 
In the days after the battle, USAAF aircraft dropped leaflets over the suspected landing zones to try and protect crews that had parachuted to safety from being lynched. Near the town limits of Bad Hersfeld carpet bombing was carried out to create fear of the American air force.

Memorial site 
On 1 August 1990, an airmen's memorial was unveiled at the crash site of the lead ship of the US bomber group in the Seulingswald near Ludwigsau-Friedlos to commemorate the fallen and as a gesture of reconciliation.

References

External links 
 Website of the Kassel Mission Historical Society (English)
 Media report on the 65th anniversary (German)
 TV interview of a veteran

World War II operations and battles of Europe
Aerial operations and battles of World War II
World War II strategic bombing of Germany
Conflicts in 1944
East Hesse